John (12 December 1801 – 29 October 1873) was King of Saxony from 9 August 1854 until his death in 1873. He was a member of the House of Wettin. During his reign, Saxony became a part of the German Empire.

Early life

John was born in Dresden, the third son of Maximilian, Hereditary Prince of Saxony—younger son of the Elector Frederick Christian of Saxony—by his first wife, Carolina of Bourbon, Princess of Parma. During most of his life, John stood little chance of inheriting the Saxon Crown: he was preceded by his father and two older brothers, Frederick Augustus and Clement. However, in 1822 Clement died unmarried in Italy, and John was now only preceded in the line of succession by his older brother Frederick Augustus.

When his uncle Anton succeeded his older brother as king (1827), John became the third in line to the throne, and after his father Maximilian renounced his succession rights in 1830, John became in the second in line. John's older brother became King Frederick Augustus II in 1836; now he was the first in line of succession to the throne. The King, married twice, was childless. John remained as heir presumptive during all the reign of his brother.

King of Saxony

John became King of Saxony after the death of his brother Frederick Augustus II on 9 August 1854.

The Judiciary Organization of 1855, the extension of the railroad network, the introduction of the freedom of trade are attributed mainly to his suggestion and promotion. Under his government, came the acceptance of the French Commercial Treaty (1862) and the acknowledgment of a contract with Italy. He exerted himself under influence of his minister Friedrich Ferdinand von Beust for the Great Germany Solution (de: Großdeutsche Lösung) of the imperial arrangement (under inclusion of Austria). In 1866 Saxony fought on the Austrian side in the Austro-Prussian War. Finally, after the defeat of the Battle of Königgrätz, Saxony joined the North German Confederation and in 1871 the German Empire under the hegemony of the Kingdom of Prussia. The King died two years later, aged seventy-one.

Beyond his political work, Johann was busy with literature. Under the pseudonym Philalethes he translated to German Dante's Divine Comedy; some parts of this work were placed in the Schloss Weesenstein. The Dresden district of Johannstadt was named after him.

Marriage and issue

In Munich on 10 November 1822 (by proxy) and again in Dresden on 21 November 1822 (in person), Johann married with the Princess Amalia of Bavaria (Amalie Auguste), daughter of King Maximilian I Joseph of Bavaria. They had nine children:

Maria Auguste Fredericka Karoline Ludovike Amalie Maximiliane Franziska Nepomucena Xaveria (b. Dresden, 22 January 1827 – d. Dresden, 8 October 1857), known as Maria.
Frederick Augustus Albert Anton Ferdinand Joseph Karl Maria Baptist Nepomuk Wilhelm Xaver Georg Fidelis (b. Dresden, 23 April 1828 – d. Schloss Sibyllenort, 19 June 1902), King Albert of Saxony.
Maria Elisabeth Maximiliana Ludovika Amalie Franziska Sophia Leopoldine Anna Baptista Xaveria Nepomucena (b. Dresden, 4 February 1830 – d. Stresa, 14 August 1912), known as Elisabeth; married firstly on 22 April 1850 to Ferdinando, Prince of Savoy and Sardinia and 1st Duke of Genoa, and secondly on 4 October 1856 to Niccolò, Marchese Rapallo.
Frederick Augustus Ernst Ferdinand Wilhelm Ludwig Anton Nepomuk Maria Baptist Xaver Vincenz (b. Dresden, 5 April 1831 – d. Schloss Weesenstein, 12 May 1847), known as Ernst.
Frederick Augustus Georg Ludwig Wilhelm Maximilian Karl Maria Nepomuk Baptist Xaver Cyriacus Romanus (b. Pillnitz, 8 August 1832 – d. Pillnitz, 15 October 1904), King Georg of Saxony (1902).
Maria Sidonia Ludovica Mathilde Wilhelmine Auguste Xaveria Baptista Nepomucena Veronica Hyacinthia Deodata (b. Pillnitz, 16 August 1834 – d. Dresden, 1 March 1862), known as Sidonia.
Anna Maria Maximiliane Stephania Karoline Johanna Luisa Xaveria Nepomucena Aloysia Benedicta, (b. Dresden, 4 January 1836 – d. Naples, 10 February 1859), known as Anna; married on 24 November 1856 to Ferdinand IV, Grand Duke of Tuscany.
Margarete Karoline Fredericka Cecilie Auguste Amalie Josephine Elisabeth Maria Johanna (b. Dresden, 24 May 1840 – d. Monza, 15 September 1858), known as Margarete; married on 4 November 1856 to Archduke Karl Ludwig of Austria, her cousin.
Sophie Maria Friederike Auguste Leopoldine Alexandrine Ernestine Albertine Elisabeth (b. Dresden, 15 March 1845 – d. Munich, 9 March 1867), known as Sophie; married on 11 February 1865 to Karl-Theodor, Duke in Bavaria, her cousin and brother of Empress Elisabeth of Austria.

King John of Saxony died at Pillnitz.

Honours

Ancestry

References

External links
 
 
 

1801 births
1873 deaths
German Roman Catholics
House of Wettin
Albertine branch
Nobility from Dresden
Saxon princes
Kings of Saxony
Members of the First Chamber of the Diet of the Kingdom of Saxony
Burials at Dresden Cathedral
Recipients of the Pour le Mérite (civil class)
Knights of the Golden Fleece of Spain
Grand Crosses of the Order of Saint Stephen of Hungary